The National Collegiate Emergency Medical Services Foundation (NCEMSF) is a non-profit organization founded to promote and advocate for campus-based emergency medical services. The organization was founded in 1993 with the goal of facilitating the exchange of information amongst collegiate EMS agencies. In 1994, NCEMSF held the first of its annual conferences, which have since become a cornerstone of the organization.

Annual Conference
Since 1994, the NCEMSF has held a yearly conference hosted by a member college or university.

Membership
The following agencies are active NCEMSF members:
Alfred University: Alfred University Rescue Squad (AURS), Alfred, NY
American University: American University First Response Team (AUFRT), Washington, DC
Amherst College: Amherst College Emergency Medical Services (ACEMS), Amherst, MA
Brown University: Brown University EMS (BEMS), Providence, RI
Carnegie Mellon University: Carnegie Mellon University Emergency Medical Service (CMUEMS), Pittsburgh, PA
Case Western Reserve University: Case Western Reserve University Emergency Medical Services (CWRU EMS), Cleveland, OH
Clark University: Clark University Emergency Medical Services (CUEMS), Worcester, MA
College of Charleston: College of Charleston EMS (COFCEMS), Charleston, SC
Fordham University: Fordham University Emergency Medical Service (FUEMS), Bronx, NY
Georgetown University: Georgetown Emergency Response Medical Service (GERMS), Washington, DC
Johns Hopkins University: Hopkins Emergency Response Organization (HERO) (HERO), Baltimore, MD
Loyola Marymount University: Loyola Marymount University EMS (LMU EMS), Los Angeles, CA
Massachusetts Institute of Technology: Massachusetts Institute of Technology Emergency Medical Services (MIT EMS), Cambridge, MA
Rice University: Rice University EMS (REMS), Houston, TX
Rochester Institute of Technology: RIT Ambulance (RITA), Rochester, NY
Santa Clara University: Santa Clara University EMS (SCU EMS), Santa Clara, CA
SUNY Albany: Five Quad VAS, Albany, NY
SUNY Oswego: Student Association Volunteer Ambulance Corps of SUNY Oswego Inc. (SAVAC), Oswego, NY
SUNY Oneonta: Oneonta State Emergency Squad (OSES), Oneonta, NY
Syracuse University: Syracuse University ambulance
Temple University: Temple University EMS, Philadelphia, PA
The George Washington University: GW EMS / Emergency Medical Response Group (EMeRG), Washington, DC
University of Delaware: University of Delaware Emergency Care Unit (UDECU), Newark, DE
University of Texas at Austin: Longhorn EMS (LEMS), Austin, TX
University of Dayton: https://udayton.edu/publicsafety/ems/squad/index.php, Dayton, OH
Ursinus College: Ursinus College Emergency Medical Services/Quick Response Service 393 (UC EMS/QRS 393), Collegeville, PA
Washington University in St. Louis: Emergency Support Team (EST), St. Louis, MO

References

External links 
 National Collegiate EMS Foundation Website

Collegiate EMS agencies
Medical and health organizations based in New York (state)